Elizabeth Ann Richardson (1918–1945) was a volunteer for the American Red Cross who served in a Clubmobile serving coffee and doughnuts to US troops during the invasion of France in the Second World War.  She was killed in a light plane crash when flying to Paris in 1945 and is now one of the four women to be buried in the Normandy American Cemetery and Memorial.

References

1918 births
1945 deaths
American Red Cross personnel
American women civilians in World War II
Milwaukee-Downer College alumni
People from Akron, Ohio
People from Mishawaka, Indiana
American civilians killed in World War II